Ragueneau is a French surname.

 Abraham Ragueneau (1623–1681), French painter
 Gaston Ragueneau (1881–1978), French athlete
 Paul Ragueneau (1608–1680), French Jesuit missionary
 Philippe Ragueneau (1917–2003), French journalist and writer

References